Laurel Heights Secondary School (formerly Sir John A. Macdonald Secondary School) is a high school in Waterloo, Ontario, Canada, operated by the Waterloo Region District School Board (WRDSB). It opened in September 2004 and provides both academic and vocational programs. The school had 1,500 students as of the 2020–21 school year. Each year, around 450 new grade 9 students are enrolled from the following elementary schools: Centennial Public School, Edna Staebler Public School, Laurelwood Public School, and Vista Hills Public School  The school is located on 650 Laurelwood Drive in northwest Waterloo. It was originally named after Sir John A. Macdonald, the first prime minister of Canada; in 2022, it was renamed to Laurel Heights Secondary School (LHSS).

History
Construction of the $27 million,  school was plagued by construction delays. It opened two months before construction was complete, with students initially limited to partial days of classes. The name was selected in 2003 by school board trustees. When they asked for suggestions, the most frequently submitted name was Oscar Peterson, but because he was still alive, Peterson wasn't eligible to have a school named after him.

The school name has been a topic of controversy for some, starting in 2018. As of 2020, some community members wanted the school name to be changed because of the historical treatment of Indigenous peoples in the Canadian residential school system. In 2021, the school board determined that the name must be changed; in March 2022, the new name of Laurel Heights Secondary School was confirmed.

The school motto is "audere est credere," inaccurately translated as "dare to believe," which is the name of the school's song. LHSS is the largest secondary school in the city of Waterloo.

The arts
The school is known for its jazz program, which was the largest in the region 2011-12. Its music groups almost always receive gold at K-W Kiwanis. In the 2018 year, the Senior Band received a platinum award at Kiwanis, and the Junior Band & Brass Quartet both received gold. The Senior Band would go on to also win Gold at Music Fest Canada 2018.

The drama department also fares well at the annual SEARS festivals. In the 2012-13 school year, they advanced to regionals. In 2014, they hosted the festival for Waterloo schools, and in 2018 they hosted NTSDF.

The school offers a wide variety of art programs as well, ranging from visual arts to photography. A talent show takes place every year in an auditorium to display and recognize students with unique talents and abilities.

Sports
LHSS offers numerous clubs, teams, and activities with over 10 choices per season. LHSS's athletic teams are called the Hurricanes (formerly the Highlanders). Both the Junior and Senior football teams were champions in 07-08 as well as juniors winning in 2009 and seniors in 2011 and 2012. LHSS also has a reputation for excellence in rugby, with the Bantam, Junior and Senior teams winning WCSSAA over 10 times combined. It is the only sport at the school to have a grade 9 team (bantam). Track and field has been very successful at OFSAA with student Anna Larsson taking gold and silver in pole vault, as well as John Fish taking bronze in the 400m. The track team continues to be successful at provincial competition. 2018 Junior girls cross country team has had much success at OFSAA, having qualified two years in a row. Girls' field hockey has been to OFSAA 4 straight years. With 3 silver medals from 2010-2012 and a gold in 2013.2019 JR Girl volleyball team won WCSSAA.

Academics
LHSS offers pre-advanced placement mathematics courses for grade 10 students, and advanced placement courses for grade 11 and 12 students. 
LHSS is the Waterloo site of the WRDSB's Fast Forward program. About 17 percent, or 245, of LHSS students are in the Fast Forward Program. Since 2008, LHSS has been the number one ranking school in Waterloo Region in the Ontario Secondary School Literacy Test, which is administered to all Grade 10 students in the Province of Ontario. As of 2019, the Fraser Institute ranked LHSS as one of the best schools in Ontario with an average performance score of 8.1 out of 10. LHSS ranks better than 90 per cent of schools in the Waterloo Region and 85 per cent of schools in all of Ontario.

See also
List of high schools in Ontario

References

External links 

 

Schools in Waterloo, Ontario
Waterloo Region District School Board
High schools in the Regional Municipality of Waterloo
2004 establishments in Ontario
Educational institutions established in 2004
John A. Macdonald
Naming controversies